Kinn is a former municipality in the Sunnfjord district of Sogn og Fjordane county, Norway. The parish of Kinn has existed for centuries and in 1838, the large parish was established as a municipality that existed from then until 1964. The municipality was centered around the island of Kinn where the main Kinn Church is located. The municipality encompassed most of the southern part of the present-day municipality of Kinn (same name, different borders) as well as parts of Askvoll (in the south) and the southwestern part of Bremanger (in the north). Upon its dissolution in 1964, it covered .

On 1 January 2020, the old Kinn name was brought back into use when the municipalities of Flora, Norway and Vågsøy merged, creating a new Kinn Municipality.

Name
The municipality (and the island) were named after the old Kinn farm since Kinn Church is located there. The name is identical with the word for "cheek", referring to the steep slope of a mountain on the island. Historically, the name was spelled Kind.

History
The parish of Kinn was established as a municipality on 1 January 1838 (see formannskapsdistrikt law). On 3 January 1861, the village of Florø (population: 846) was established as a ladested (port town) and it was therefore separated from the municipality of Kinn to become a municipality of its own. This left 6,531 residents in Kinn. Then on 1 January 1866, the northern district of Kinn on the islands of Bremangerlandet and Frøya and the mainland area surrounding the Gulen Fjord (population: 1,852) was separated from Kinn to form the separate municipality of Bremanger. After the split, Kinn was left with 4,679 inhabitants.

On 1 January 1923, Kinn was split into three separate municipalities:
Kinn, which included the western islands and the mainland areas surrounding Florø, but not including the port town (population: 2,508)
Bru, which included the southern islands of Svanøy and Askrova, a small area south of the Førdefjorden, the area around the village of Stavang, and the large valley east of the village of Norddalsfjord (population: 1,560)
Eikefjord, which included the eastern district around the eastern end of the Eikefjorden (population: 929)

During the 1960s, there were many municipal mergers across Norway due to the work of the Schei Committee. On 1 January 1964, a merger took place which reunited most of the old municipality of Kinn. Before the merger Kinn had a population of 3,567.  The new municipality was called Flora, and it included:
the ladested of Florø (population: 2,040)
the municipalities of Kinn (population: 3,567) and Eikefjord (population: 919)
the parts of Bru municipality that were north of the Førdefjorden (population: 1,155)
the villages of Husefest and Breivik in Bremanger municipality (population: 9)
the Steindal valley area in Vevring municipality (population: 25)

Government

Municipal council
The municipal council  of Kinn was made up of 21 representatives that were elected to four year terms.  The party breakdown of the final municipal council was as follows:

Notable residents
Hans Jensen Blom, the vicar of Kinn Church and member of the Parliament of Norway
Mathias Sigwardt Greve, a physician who briefly worked in Kinn
Ivar Lykke Falch Lind, the former mayor and bailiff of Kinn
Michael Sars, the vicar of Kinn Church from 1831 to 1838
Georg Ossian Sars, a marine biologist who discovered that cod fish eggs are pelagic

See also
List of former municipalities of Norway

References

External links

Weather information for Kinn 

Kinn
Former municipalities of Norway
1838 establishments in Norway
1964 disestablishments in Norway